Rigan (also Romanized as Rīgān) is a village in Soleyman Rural District, Soleyman District, Zaveh County, Razavi Khorasan Province, Iran. At the 2006 census, its population was 590, in 139 families.

References 

Populated places in Zaveh County